The CEV qualification for the 2006 FIVB Volleyball Men's World Championship saw member nations compete for nine places at the finals in Japan.

Draw
35 CEV national teams entered qualification. The teams were distributed according to their position in the FIVB Senior Men's Rankings as of 15 January 2004 using the serpentine system for their distribution. (Rankings shown in brackets) Teams ranked 1–8 did not compete in the first and second rounds, and automatically qualified for the third round. Teams ranked 9–20 did not compete in the first round, and automatically qualified for the second round.

First round

Second round

Third round

Playoff round

First round

Pool A
Venue:  English Institute of Sport, Sheffield, England
Dates: January 13–15, 2005
All times are Greenwich Mean Time (UTC±00:00)

|}

|}

Pool B
Venue:  Sportcentrum, Tiszaújváros, Hungary
Dates: May 13–15, 2005
All times are Central European Summer Time (UTC+02:00)

|}

|}

Pool C
Venue:  Sports Hall Polivalentă, Tulcea, Romania
Dates: May 6–8, 2005
All times are Eastern European Summer Time (UTC+03:00)

|}

|}

Pool D
Venue:  Kalevi Spordihall, Tallinn, Estonia
Dates: April 29–May 1, 2005
All times are Eastern European Summer Time (UTC+03:00)

|}

|}

Second round

Pool E
Venue:  DKS Arena, Varna, Bulgaria
Dates: May 13–15, 2005
All times are Eastern European Summer Time (UTC+03:00)

|}

|}

Pool F
Venue:  Opava Sports Hall, Opava, Czech Republic
Dates: May 27–29, 2005
All times are Central European Summer Time (UTC+02:00)

|}

|}

Pool G
Venue:  Pavilhão dos Desportos, Vila do Conde, Portugal
Dates: May 20–22, 2005
All times are Western European Summer Time (UTC+01:00)

|}

|}

Pool H
Venue:  Tampereen jäähalli, Tampere, Finland
Dates: May 27–29, 2005
All times are Eastern European Summer Time (UTC+03:00)

|}

|}

Third round

Pool I
Venue:  Palavesuvio, Naples, Italy
Dates: July 29–31, 2005
All times are Central European Summer Time (UTC+02:00)

|}

|}

Pool J
Venue:  Neapolis Arena, Larissa, Greece
Dates: July 18–20, 2005
All times are Eastern European Summer Time (UTC+03:00)

|}

|}

Pool K
Venue:  La Palestre, Le Cannet, France
Dates: July 28–30, 2005
All times are Central European Summer Time (UTC+02:00)

|}

|}

Pool L
Venue:  Hala Podpromie, Rzeszów, Poland
Dates: July 15–17, 2005
All times are Central European Summer Time (UTC+02:00)

|}

|}

Playoff round
Venue:  DKS Arena, Varna, Bulgaria
Dates: August 19–21, 2005
All times are Eastern European Summer Time (UTC+03:00)

|}

|}

References

External links
 2006 World Championship Qualification

2006 FIVB Volleyball Men's World Championship
2005 in volleyball